The Mexico City Grand Prix or Mexico City Open is an open international badminton tournament held in Mexico City, Mexico. The tournament was a Grand Prix level, with the total prize money equaling US$50,000.

Previous winners

References

External links
 Federación Mexicana de Badminton

Badminton tournaments in Mexico